Peterscourt is a building in Peterborough, on City Road, which was designed by Sir George Gilbert Scott and completed in 1859. It is Grade II listed.

History
The building was designed for, and housed, St. Peter's Teacher Training College for men until 1914.  From 1921 to 1938 it was a teacher training college for women.

Subsequently it has been used mainly for offices, by Perkins Engines and Peterborough Development Corporation, who were head-quartered there from 1969 to 1975.

Restoration and refurbishment took place in 1985.

As of 2017 it is the home of the Eco Innovation Centre.

Listing and description
The building is mainly listed for the eighteenth century doorway, brought from the London Guildhall following war damage.

References

1859 establishments in England
Buildings and structures completed in 1859
Grade II listed buildings in Peterborough
Buildings and structures in Peterborough